Tomás Dunster, better known by the name Tommy Dunster , is an Argentinian actor who has played in soap operas around the world.  He is best known in the United States as the villainous George Marston on Desire, Juan Pablo Renato Ruiz de Vasquez on All My Children, Luca Colucci on Rebelde way sea son 1, adult Cristóbal Bauer on Casi Ángeles in the season 4 in 2010 and Azul's father in 2013 on Aliados.

External links

Living people
Year of birth missing (living people)
Place of birth missing (living people)